Westford is the name of some places in the U.S. state of Wisconsin:
Westford, Dodge County, Wisconsin
Westford, Richland County, Wisconsin